This is a complete list of works by American science fiction and fantasy author L. E. Modesitt Jr.

Series

Fantasy fiction series

The Saga of Recluce (internal chronological order)

From the Forest (2023)
Magi'i of Cyador (2001)
Scion of Cyador (2001)
Fall of Angels (1996)
The Chaos Balance (1997)
Arms-Commander (2010)
Cyador's Heirs (2014)
Heritage of Cyador (2014)
The Mongrel Mage (2017)
Outcasts of Order (2018)
The Mage-Fire War (2019)
Fairhaven Rising (2021)
The Towers of the Sunset (1992)
The White Order (1998)
The Magic Engineer (1994)
Colors of Chaos (1999)
Natural Ordermage (2007) 
Mage-Guard of Hamor (2008)
The Order War (1995)
Wellspring of Chaos (2004)
Ordermaster (2005)
The Magic of Recluce (1991)
The Death of Chaos (1995)

Spellsong Cycle

Set in the world of Erde, where song has magical power – and exacts a terrible price
The Soprano Sorceress (1997)
The Spellsong War (1998)
Darksong Rising (1999)
The Shadow Sorceress (2001)
Shadowsinger (2002)

The Corean Chronicles

Set on the world of Corus (or Acorus), where strange and dangerous beasts roam and people with magical Talent can perform astonishing feats
Legacies (2002)
Darknesses (2003)
Scepters (2004)
Alector's Choice (2005)
Cadmian's Choice (2006)
Soarer's Choice (2006)
The Lord-Protector's Daughter (2008)
Lady-Protector (2011)

The Imager Portfolio

The Imager Portfolio is set on the world of Terahnar, where a small number of people are imagers, who have the power to create objects through visualization; if uncontrolled, imaging can lead to the death of the imager.
Imager (2009) 
Imager's Challenge (2009) 
Imager's Intrigue (2010) 
Scholar (2011) (New cast of characters, taking place, chronologically, before the first three books.) 
Princeps (2012) 
Imager’s Battalion (2013)  
Antiagon Fire (2013)  
Rex Regis (2014) 
Madness in Solidar (2015)  (First in a set that takes place some 380 years after the Wars of Consolidation.)
Treachery’s Tools (2016) 
Assassin's Price (2017) 
Endgames (2019)

The Grand Illusion
Isolate (2021)
Councilor (August 9, 2022) 
Contrarian (2023)

Science fiction series

Timegod's World

Drawing on Norse legend, these books follow the story of the time-traveling Immortals of Query, and their two greatest heroes – who both save and doom their people
The Fires of Paratime (1982)
Timediver's Dawn (1992)
The Timegod (1993) (republication of The Fires of Paratime)
Timegod's World (2001) Omnibus.

The Forever Hero

In the far future, when Earth is a devastated ruin, an immortal is born, wishes one great wish, and takes on a great task

Dawn for a Distant Earth (1987)
The Silent Warrior (1987)
In Endless Twilight (1988)
The Forever Hero (2000) Omnibus, combines above three books

The Ecolitan Institute novels (internal chronological order)

The Ecolitan Operation (1989)
The Ecologic Secession (1990)
Empire & Ecolitan (2001) Omnibus of the two above
The Ecologic Envoy (1986)
The Ecolitan Enigma (1997)
Ecolitan Prime (2003) Omnibus of the two above

Ghost Novels

SF/spy stories, set in an alternate world
Of Tangible Ghosts (1994)
The Ghost of the Revelator (1998)
Ghost of the White Nights (2001)
Ghosts of Columbia (2005) Omnibus, combining Of Tangible Ghosts and The Ghost of the Revelator

Parafaith Universe

The Parafaith War (1996)
The Ethos Effect (2003)

Archform

Archform: Beauty (2000), 
Flash (2004),

Non-Series science fiction

The Hammer of Darkness (1985), 
Adiamante (1996), . Review
Gravity Dreams (2000), 
The Octagonal Raven (2001), 
The Eternity Artifact (2005), 
The Elysium Commission (2007), . Review
Haze (2009), 
Empress of Eternity (2010), 
The One-Eyed Man: A Fugue, With Winds and Accompaniment (2013), 
Solar Express (2015) 
Quantum Shadows (2020)

Collaborations

The Green Progression (with Bruce Scott Levinson) (1992)

Collections

Viewpoints Critical (2008) –  collection of short stories
Recluce Tales (2017) - collection of short stories that take place in the Recluce world

Short fiction
The Great American Economy (1973) Analog Science Fiction and Science Fact, May 1973**
A House by Any Other Name (1974) Analog Science Fiction/Science Fact, November 1974
Came the Revolution (1977) Galaxy Science Fiction, September 1977
Iron Man, Plastic Ships (1979) Isaac Asimov's Science Fiction Magazine, Oct 1979**
Power to ...? (1990) Analog Science Fiction and Fact, November 1990**
Reaction Time (1978) Analog Science Fiction/Science Fact, January 1978
Rule of Law (1981) Analog Science Fiction/Science Fact, April 27, 1981**
Second Coming (1979) Asimov's SF Adventure Magazine, Spring 1979**
Understanding (2000) On Spec, Summer 2000**
Viewpoint Critical (1978) Analog Science Fiction/Science Fact, July 1978
Precision Set (2001) On Spec Spring 2001**
The Pilots (2002) In the Shadow of the Wall: Vietnam Stories that Might Have Been (ed. Byron R. Tetrick)**
The Dock to Heaven (2003) Low Port (ed. Sharon Lee & Steve Miller)**
The Swan Pilot (2004) Emerald Magic: Great Tales of Irish Fantasy (ed. Andrew M. Greeley)**
Fallen Angel (2004), from Flights: Extreme Visions of Fantasy (ed. Al Sarrantonio)**
The Swan Pilot (2004), Emerald Magic (ed. Andrew M. Greeley) (Tor Books)**
News Clips Recovered from the NYC Ruins (2005), from The Leading Edge, Brigham Young University Press.**
Ghost Mission (2006), from Slipstreams (ed. Martin Greenberg and John Helfers) (DAW Books)**
Sisters of Sarronnyn, Sisters of Westwind (2006), from Jim Baen's UNIVERSE, August 2006**
Spec-Ops (2007), from Future Weapons of War (ed. Joe Haldeman and Martin Greenberg) (Baen Books)**
The Difference (2007), from Man vs. Machine (ed. Martin Greenberg and John Helfers) (DAW Books)**
Black Ordermage (2008)**
Beyond the Obvious Wind (2008)**
Always Outside the Lines (2008)**
Life-Suspension (2009), from "Federations" (ed. John Joseph Adams (Prime Books)
A More Perfect Union (2013), from The Mad Scientist's Guide to World Domination (ed. John Joseph Adams)

Stories listed above marked with a double-asterisk are included in L. E. Modesitt, Jr., Viewpoints Critical: Selected Stories (New York: Tor Books, 2008) .  The three stories dated 2008 appeared for the first time in this book.

Short non-fiction
Story behind „Antiagon Fire“ – The Antiagon Fire That Almost Wasn’t (2013), from "Story Behind the Book : Volume 1"

References

Bibliographies by writer
Bibliographies of American writers
Fantasy bibliographies
Science fiction bibliographies